Paroxacis is a genus of false blister beetles in the family Oedemeridae. There are about five described species in Paroxacis.

Species
These five species belong to the genus Paroxacis:
 Paroxacis antillarum (Champion, 1896)
 Paroxacis debilis (Horn, 1896)
 Paroxacis interrita (Arnett, 1951)
 Paroxacis lucana (LeConte, 1866)
 Paroxacis recendita (Arnett, 1951)

References

Further reading

 
 

Oedemeridae
Tenebrionoidea genera
Articles created by Qbugbot